Psi (Ѱ, ѱ; italics: Ѱ ѱ) is a letter in the early Cyrillic alphabet, derived from the Greek letter psi (Ψ, ψ). It represents the sound /ps/, as in English naps.  According to the school rules developed in the 16th and the 17th centuries, such as Meletius Smotrytsky's grammar book, it was intended for use in words of Greek origin, but it was occasionally used for writing native words as well like Ukrainian  (psy, “dogs”). It was used especially in words relating to the Eastern Orthodox Church, as can be seen in its continuing use in Church Slavonic.  

Psi was eliminated from the Russian orthography, along with ksi, omega, and the yuses, in the Civil Script of 1708 (Peter the Great's Grazhdansky Shrift), and it has also been dropped from other secular languages. It continues to be used in Church Slavonic.

Computing codes

See also 
 Psi (disambiguation), for other meanings.

Notes

References 
 Cyrillic alphabet (Кириллица) at Omniglot
 Simovyč, V. and J.B. Rudnycky, “The History of Ukrainian Orthography”, in Kubijovyč, Volodymyr ed. (1963), Ukraine: A Concise Encyclopædia, v 1.  Toronto: University of Toronto Press. .

Cyrillic letters